The Second Battle of Chattanooga was a battle in the American Civil War, beginning on August 21, 1863, as the opening battle in the Chickamauga Campaign. The larger and more famous battles were the Battles for Chattanooga (generally referred to as the Battle of Chattanooga) in November 1863.

Background

On August 16, 1863, Maj. Gen. William S. Rosecrans, commander of the Army of the Cumberland, launched a campaign to take Chattanooga, Tennessee. Col. John T. Wilder's brigade of the Union 4th Division, XIV Army Corps, marched to a location northeast of Chattanooga where the Confederates could see them, reinforcing Gen. Braxton Bragg's expectations of a Union attack on the town from that direction.

Battle

On August 21, Wilder reached the Tennessee River opposite Chattanooga and ordered the 18th Indiana Light Artillery (Capt. Eli Lilly's battery) to begin shelling the town. The shells caught many soldiers and civilians in town in church observing a day of prayer and fasting. The bombardment sank two steamers docked at the landing and created a great deal of consternation amongst the Confederates.

Aftermath
Continuing periodically over the next two weeks, the shelling helped keep Bragg's attention to the northeast while the bulk of Rosecrans's army crossed the Tennessee River well west and south of Chattanooga. When Bragg learned on September 8 that the Union army was in force southwest of the city, he abandoned Chattanooga and marched his Army of Tennessee into Georgia. Bragg's army marched down the LaFayette Road and camped in the city of LaFayette.

Battlefield preservation

The American Battlefield Trust and its partners have acquired and preserved  of the Chattanooga battlefield as of late 2021.

See also
First Battle of Chattanooga

Notes

References
National Park Service battle description
 CWSAC Report Update

Chattanooga II
Chattanooga II
Chattanooga II
Chattanooga II
Hamilton County, Tennessee
1863 in Tennessee
Chattanooga
August 1863 events